Sassanid Archaeological Landscape of Fars Region is the official denomination given by UNESCO to eight Sasanian-era archaeological sites situated in the southeast of Fars Province, Iran. It was recognized on 30 June 2018 as a UNESCO World Heritage Site.

Sites

References 

World Heritage Sites in Iran